The MAMA Award for Song of the Year is an honor presented at the annual MAMA Awards, a South Korean awards ceremony presented by Mnet. One of the event's four most prestigious daesang (or grand prize) awards, it was first awarded during the ceremony's eighth edition in 2006—then titled the Mnet KM Music Festival. Having gone through various name changes since its inaugural ceremony in 1999, it was renamed the Mnet Asian Music Awards from 2009 until it was rebranded as the MAMA Awards in 2022.

Prior to 2021, the judging criteria for the award consisted a breakdown of 20% online voting, 40% expert evaluation, 30% digital sales, and 10% record sales. However, preceding the announcement of the nominations for the 2021 ceremony, it was revealed that online fan voting would be removed from consideration. As of 2022, the judging criteria for the award consists of 40% judges panel evaluation and 60% digital song downloads and streaming (40% from South Korea and 20% global).

The Song of the Year award was first presented to vocal group SG Wannabe for "Partner for Life" in 2006, where they also won Album of the Year for the track's parent album The 3rd Masterpiece. Twice and BTS currently holds the distinction for the most awarded artists overall in the category—having both won the prize three times. Two artists currently have the second-most wins with two each: Big Bang (2007, 2015), and 2NE1 (2009, 2011). IU and BTS have the highest number of shortlisted Song of the Year nominations—with a total of six each throughout the event's history, while Exo has the second-most shortlisted nominations—with five.

Winners and nominees

2000s

2010s

2020s

Artists with multiple wins
3 wins
 BTS
 Twice

2 wins
 Big Bang
 2NE1

Artists with multiple nominations

6 nominations
 IU
 BTS

5 nominations
 Exo

4 nominations
 Blackpink
 Twice

3 nominations
 Big Bang
 2NE1

2 nominations
 Red Velvet
 Zico
 Sistar
 Psy
 Busker Busker
 Baek Ji-young
 TVXQ
 Epik High

Note: Shortlisted nominations only

See also
 MAMA Award for Album of the Year
 MAMA Award for Artist of the Year
 MAMA Award for Worldwide Icon of the Year
 Melon Music Award for Song of the Year

Notes

References

External links
 

MAMA Awards
Song awards